František Vohryzek (born 9 January 1907, date of death unknown) was a Czech fencer. He competed in the individual and team épée and the team foil events at the 1936 Summer Olympics.

References

External links
 

1907 births
Year of death missing
Czech male épée fencers
Czechoslovak male épée fencers
Olympic fencers of Czechoslovakia
Fencers at the 1936 Summer Olympics
Czech male foil fencers
Czechoslovak male foil fencers